This is the discography of American singer-songwriter Melanie Safka, mainly known mononymously as Melanie.

Albums

Studio albums

Live albums

Soundtrack albums

Compilation albums

Singles

Notes

References

External links

Discographies of American artists
Pop music discographies
Folk music discographies